Southwest Championship Wrestling (SCW) was a professional wrestling promotion that was owned by Joe Blanchard and based in San Antonio, Texas, from 1978 to 1985, when it was purchased by Texas All-Star Wrestling and absorbed into that company.

History

Venues
Its television matches were usually taped at The Junction, a small boxing venue in San Antonio, although occasional matches from cards at San Antonio's HemisFair Arena were also seen.

Television
Starting on December 5, 1982, Southwest Championship Wrestling became the first weekly wrestling program on the USA Cable Network, airing Sundays at 11:00 a.m. Eastern Time. As a result of the new national exposure, SWCW staged a one-night tournament in Houston, Texas, to determine an "Undisputed World Heavyweight Champion." Adrian Adonis was the winner of this tournament, and as a result he was presented with the oldest existing championship belt by Lou Thesz as well as a brand new belt. The 75-year old belt is now on display at the George Tragos/Lou Thesz Professional Wrestling Hall of Fame in Waterloo, Iowa

However, because of a particularly bloody match between Tully Blanchard and "Bruiser" Bob Sweetan (which USA refused to air), the inability of the promotion to keep paying USA the $7,000 per week to keep the time slot, and a monetary offer made to the cable channel by WWF owner Vince McMahon to replace Southwest Championship Wrestling with his own programming, USA canceled the program (in spite of the high ratings the show was garnering for the network) and turned the time slot over to WWF All American Wrestling. Adonis' "undisputed championship" simply faded from SCW storylines within a few months and was abandoned in September 1983, and in April 1985, the promotion was sold to Texas All-Star Wrestling.

Working alliance
Southwest Championship Wrestling had many working alliances with other wrestling promotions such as the American Wrestling Association when its world champion Nick Bockwinkel defended his title at SWC cards. Southwest Championship Wrestling also had talent exchange deals with World Class Championship Wrestling in Dallas and the World Wrestling Council in Puerto Rico.

Rights of Footage
In 2010, JADAT Sports Inc. bought all the footage of SCW and Texas All Star from Ronnie Martinez. They have released a DVD "Best of the 80s Volume I", which contains mostly SCW footage. The Southwest Championship Wrestling tape library is one of the few classic wrestling tape libraries not owned by World Wrestling Entertainment. in 2021 JADAT Sports Inc. appointed Stream Go Media LLC as the exclusive distribution agents for both SCW and Texas All-Star Wrestling. Footage from both SCW and Texas All-Star Wrestling both appear on the streaming service "Wrestling Legends Network" built and operated by Stream Go Media, LLC launched on May 25th 2021 on the Roku platform and on www.WrestlingLegendsNetwork.tv.

Championships
For most of the promotion's existence, the World Heavyweight Champion of the American Wrestling Association was recognized as SCW's top champion as well.

Alumni

Wrestlers
Chris Adams
Adrian Adonis
Austin Idol
Gino Hernandez
Tully Blanchard
Ted DiBiase
Dory Funk Jr.
Terry Funk
"Bruiser" Bob Sweetan
Scott Casey
Terry Allen
Bob Orton Jr.
Chavo Guerrero Sr.
Mando Guerrero
Brett Sawyer
Buzz Sawyer
Eric Embry
Tim Brooks
Dan Greer
The Ninja Warrior
CT Night The Boss
Ivan Putski
Tony Atlas
Skip Young
Buddy Landel
Bobby Jaggers
Kareem Muhammad
Blackjack Mulligan
Dick Murdoch
Iceman Parsons
Al Perez
Larry Lane
Manny Fernandez
Tom Prichard
Chicky Starr
Kelly Kiniski
Adrian Street
Bushwhacker Luke
Bushwhacker Butch
Jonathan Boyd
Mil Máscaras
Rick Rude
Eddie Mansfield
Dick Slater
Nick Bockwinkel
Jim Duggan
Wahoo McDaniel
Abdullah the Butcher
Kevin Sullivan
Bruiser Brody
Jerry Lawler
Eddie Gilbert
Tito Santana
The Sheik
Baron von Raschke
Ron Sexton
Tank Patton
Tiger Conway Jr.
Rudy Boy Gonzalez
The Grappler
Tony Anthony
The Hood
Manny Villalobos

Commentators
Gene Kelly
Gene Goodsen
Steve Stack
Rapido Rodriguez

References

External links
Southwest Championship Wrestling title histories

 
Independent professional wrestling promotions based in the Southwestern United States
Entertainment companies established in 1978
1985 disestablishments in Texas
Sports in San Antonio
USA Network original programming
1982 American television series debuts
1983 American television series endings
1978 establishments in Texas
Companies disestablished in 1985